Raymond Briggs  (19 January 1895 – 4 April 1985) was a senior British Army officer who fought in both the First and the Second World Wars. During the latter he led the 1st Armoured Division at the Second Battle of El Alamein in late 1942, and throughout the subsequent Tunisian campaign.

Military career
Briggs served in the First World War with the British Army's Machine Gun Corps, receiving his commission in 1915.

Briggs remained in the army during the interwar period, transferring to the Tank Corps (later the Royal Tank Regiment) and attended the Staff College, Camberley from 1925 to 1926. He was appointed Deputy Assistant Director for Mechanized Warfare at the War Office in 1936, and from 14 October 1937 became a GSO2 at the War Office. He was promoted to brevet major on 1 January 1933 brevet lieutenant-colonel on 1 July 1938, and returned to the Staff College to become an instructor in armoured warfare.

He served in the Second World War as a General Staff Officer (GSO), before being promoted to acting brigadier and becoming the commander of the 2nd Armoured Brigade, part of the 1st Armoured Division in December 1940. He was promoted to colonel on 12 August 1941, with seniority backdated to 1 July 1941. As commander of this brigade he participated in the First Battle of El Alamein. He was then awarded the Distinguished Service Order (DSO) on 13 August 1942 and promoted to acting major-general on 21 August and appointed General Officer Commanding (GOC) of the 1st Armoured Division. He commanded the division during the Second Battle of El Alamein and was mentioned in despatches. He also received the Companion of the Order of the Bath (CB) for his role in the battle.

His rank of major-general was made temporary on 21 August 1943. He continued to command the division throughout the Tunisian campaign, which ended in May 1943, and he was again mentioned in dispatches on 24 June 1943. With the conclusion of the campaign, he was dismissed by his superior, General Sir Bernard Montgomery, the Eighth Army commander. This was followed by an appointment, in July, to become the Director of the Royal Armoured Corps at the War Office. He continued in this role until he retired from the army, with the honorary rank of major-general on 25 March 1947.

References

Bibliography

External links
Imperial War Museum Interview
Generals of World War II

1895 births
1985 deaths
Academics of the Staff College, Camberley
British Army major generals
British Army generals of World War II
British Army personnel of World War I
Companions of the Distinguished Service Order
Companions of the Order of the Bath
Graduates of the Staff College, Camberley
King's Own Royal Regiment officers
Liverpool Scottish soldiers
Machine Gun Corps officers
Military personnel from Merseyside
People educated at Bedford School
Royal Tank Regiment officers
War Office personnel in World War II